The area code 868 is assigned to Trinidad and Tobago, a member of the North American Numbering Plan (NANP). The telephone numbering plan for the country is known as the National Numbering Plan. It is part of a system used for assigning telephone numbers in Trinidad and Tobago, and functions as a part of the North American Numbering Plan (NANP).  It is regulated by the Telecommunications Authority of Trinidad and Tobago, which holds responsibility for telecommunications in the country.

Due to a long established affiliation with NANP, phone numbers in the Republic of Trinidad and Tobago are often styled as "(868) NXX-xxxx". However, the International Telecommunications Union's standards such as E.164 and E.123 both strongly advocate the inclusion of a "+1" prefix to indicate "868" is a part of the NANP.

History
Area code 868 ("TNT") was created during a split from the original Area code 809 with permissive dialing beginning 1 June 1997. 
With the end of permissive dialing on 31 May 1998, all calls placed to the Republic of Trinidad and Tobago required the use of the +1 868 prefix. The local telephone regulator proposed the area code 868, which corresponds to "TNT"—an abbreviation for Trinidad and Tobago—to reflect the nation's identity within the NANP.

Dialing to Trinidad and Tobago
 From within North America (NANP)
When calling Trinidad and Tobago from elsewhere in the North American Numbering Plan (e.g., from the United States or Canada), callers dial as if undertaking regular ten-digit dialing within those countries. Callers must simply dial 1 + 868 + seven digit phone number.

 From outside NANP
When calling to Trinidad and Tobago from outside the NANP (e.g., from the United Kingdom), callers must dial their international dialing prefix followed by 1 to access the North American Numbering Plan.  For example, a call placed from the United Kingdom would be dialled as 00 + 1 + 868 + local seven digit phone number.

Dialing within Trinidad and Tobago 
When placing a phone call from Trinidad and Tobago, also known as HNPA (home numbering plan area) dialing, callers simply use seven-digit dialing (i.e. dialing the last seven digits of the phone number).

To North America (NANP)
When calling other places in the North American Numbering Plan, callers dial as if undertaking regular ten-digit dialing in those countries. Callers dial 1 + NPA area code + seven digit phone number.

Though usually toll-free when dialed from the US, not all 1-800 phone numbers are toll-free when dialed from Trinidad and Tobago, and may be treated as a toll call.

To areas outside the NANP
When calling to areas outside the NANP (e.g., the United Kingdom), callers dial 011 + country calling code + phone number. In the case of the UK, a user would dial 011 + 44 + UK phone number.

General
National Operations Centre: 911, Police Force: 999, Ambulance: 811, Fire: 990
Information/Directory Assistance: 6411, 611 (proposed replacement)
Operator: 0

See also
 List of NANP area codes
 North American Numbering Plan
 Area codes in the Caribbean

Notes

References

External links
Telecommunications Authority of Trinidad and Tobago
North American Numbering Plan Administrator
List of exchanges from AreaCodeDownload.com, 868 Area Code

868
Communications in Trinidad and Tobago